The Japanese destroyer  was one of 15 s built for the Imperial Japanese Navy (IJN) in the late 1920s. The ship was converted into a patrol boat in 1940 and then into a destroyer transport the next year. After the start of the Pacific War, she participated in the Philippines Campaign in late 1941, the Dutch East Indies campaign in early 1942 and played a minor role in the Battle of Midway in mid-1942. She was sunk by a British submarine in mid-1945.

Design and description
The Minekaze class was designed with higher speed and better seakeeping than the preceding s. They were powered by two Parsons geared steam turbines, each driving one propeller shaft, using steam provided by four Kampon water-tube boilers. Their crew consisted of 148 officers and crewmen.

The main armament of the Minekaze-class ships consisted of four  Type 3 guns in single mounts; one gun forward of the superstructure, one between the two funnels, one aft of the rear funnel, and the last gun atop the aft superstructure. The guns were numbered '1' to '4' from front to rear. The ships carried three above-water twin sets of  torpedo tubes; one mount was in the well deck between the forward superstructure and the forward gun and the other two were between the aft funnel and aft superstructure. They could also carry 20 mines as well as minesweeping gear.

In 1940, she was converted into a patrol boat that displaced . These were replaced by ten license-built  Type 96 light AA guns and 16 depth charges. The following year, the ship was rebuilt as a destroyer transport able to carry two  and accommodate 250 troops. To make room for these, her stern was cut down to the waterline for a ramp and her aftmost 12 cm gun, the remaining torpedo tubes and the depth charges were removed.

Construction and career
Nadakaze, built at the Maizuru Naval Arsenal, was laid down on 9 January 1920, launched on 26 June 1920 and completed on 30 September 1921. On commissioning, the ship was assigned to Yokosuka Naval District as part of Destroyer Division 3 under the IJN 2nd Fleet. From 1937 to 1939, Nadakaze was assigned to patrols of the northern and central China coastlines in support of Japanese combat operations in the Second Sino-Japanese War. In December 1938, Destroyer Division 3 was disbanded, and Nadakaze was reassigned to the reserves.

As Patrol Boat No.2
In April 1940, after extensive modifications, Nadakaze was returned to active duty as a No.1-class patrol boat, and renamed . After the start of the Pacific War on 7 December 1941, Patrol Boat No. 2 was assigned to patrols and escort missions in the Philippines, Netherlands East Indies and Solomon Islands. In January 1943, Patrol Boat No. 2 was reassigned to the Japanese home islands, escorting convoys between Moji, Takao, Saigon, Manila and Singapore. In December 1943, the patrol boat became the designated support ship for Imperial Japanese Navy Land Forces based in Balikpapan, Borneo.

On 25 July 1945, Patrol Boat No. 2  was torpedoed and sunk by the Royal Navy submarine  near Lombok Strait, in the Lesser Sunda Islands, Netherlands East Indies at position . The ship was removed from the Navy List on 30 September 1945.

Notes

References

External links
Minekaze-class destroyers on Materials of the Imperial Japanese Navy

Minekaze-class destroyers
Ships built by Maizuru Naval Arsenal
1920 ships
Second Sino-Japanese War naval ships of Japan
World War II destroyers of Japan
Ships sunk by British submarines
World War II shipwrecks in the Java Sea
Maritime incidents in July 1945